The following polls make up the 1981 NCAA Division I baseball rankings.  Baseball America began publishing its poll of the top 20 teams in college baseball in 1981.  Collegiate Baseball Newspaper published its first human poll of the top 20 teams in college baseball in 1957, and expanded to rank the top 30 teams in 1961.  This was the first season with two major polls.

Baseball America
Currently, only the final poll from the 1981 season is available.

Collegiate Baseball
Currently, only the final poll from the 1981 season is available.

References

 
College baseball rankings in the United States